The New Zealand grebe (Poliocephalus rufopectus),also known as New Zealand dabchick or weweia, is a member of the grebe family endemic to New Zealand.

Description 
The New Zealand grebe has dark brown plumage, a small black head with fine silver feathers, a black pointed bill and characteristic yellow eyes. It grows to  about 29 cm, and weigh about 250 g. Non-breeding individuals have a paler plumage and females tend to be a bit lighter, smaller and have a slightly shorter bill than males.

Distribution and habitat 
This grebe species inhabits mainly shallow freshwater lakes, ponds and sheltered inlets.
Currently it is found mainly in the North Island, where it is well distributed on the coastal lakes of the West coast from North Cape to Pukekohe and from Taranaki to Paraparaumu, as well as on ponds of the Volcanic Plateau, Gisborne, Hawkes bay and the Wairarapa. 
Formerly this species was also present in the lowland lakes of the South Island, but underwent a rapid decline, for unknown reasons, in the 19th century - the last regular breeding record in the South Island was in 1941. In 2012 a pair bred near Takaka for the first time in recent history.

Behaviour 
These freshwater diving birds usually fly only at night, whilst during the day, they are always found in the water, swimming on the surface and frequently diving to feed. Thus, if they are in danger or get disturbed at daytime they do not flee by flying, but swimming or diving away. During autumn and winter, they are found forming flocks, while during the breeding season they are mostly seen in monogamous pairs. They show aggressive territorial behaviour towards intruders  and the otherwise silent species give short calls throughout the breeding season and when in danger.

Diet 

Their diet consists mostly of aquatic insects and their larvae, as well as small molluscs such as freshwater snails. Bigger prey such as fish and freshwater crayfish are sometimes eaten too. Thus, their bill, being short and pointed, is adapted to their mainly invertebrate diet. They catch their prey during dives and feeding underwater or pick it from the water surface.

Breeding 

The breeding season is from June to March. On average 2-3 eggs are laid and incubated 22–23 days by both female and male, in a nest. The nest is mostly made out of surrounding vegetation, including floating plant material. Hatched chicks are precocial, although being flightless for the first few weeks they can swim and dive. Both parents assist in rearing and feeding their young for up to 70 days after hatching. Until the adult plumage develops, the chick has irregular striped markings on head and neck and the bill is black.

Conservation 
This species is endemic to New Zealand and is nowadays only found in the North Island. In 1994, the IUCN classified the New Zealand grebe as Endangered, but due to conservation actions including habitat management, its population has recently increased to around 1,900-2,000 birds and was reclassified as Near Threatened in 2016, and to least concern in 2022. Human activity currently has a net benefit as artificial habitat, including farm dams and ponds formed for stock water supplies, increases the area of occupation for the grebes. So, although the population is still quite small it is thought not to be in decline anymore.

References

External links

BirdLife Species Factsheet.
www.nzbirdsonline.org.nz/species/new-zealand-dabchick

Endemic birds of New Zealand
Podicipedidae
Birds described in 1843
Taxa named by George Robert Gray